Antoine Simon Airport  is the fourth airport in Haiti in passenger traffic and is  north of Les Cayes, a Caribbean coastal city in Haiti's Southern peninsula.

History
The airport is named after François C. Antoine Simon, the 18th President of Haiti (1908–1911). It was financed and built by the Haitian government and inaugurated on 7 May 2005 by then Prime Minister Gérard Latortue. Taiwan financed the construction of the access road to the airport.

On February 1, 2013, Haiti laid the first stone on the expansion of the Antoine-Simon Airport. Both runway ends have displaced thresholds.

The project is part of broader efforts to ramp up infrastructure development in Haiti's South department. Haiti officials (Prime Minister Laurent Lamothe and Tourism Minister Stephanie Villedrouin) suggested that the airport would open up completely the southern region as the country sees tourism as a promising sector capable of creating thousands of jobs in the region.

Another airport is being built on the neighboring island of Île-à-Vache.

Airlines and destinations

Sunrise Airways operate a regular flight three times a week and other charter services at the airport:

See also
Transport in Haiti
List of airports in Haiti

References

External links
OpenStreetMap - Les Cayes
OurAirports - Antoine-Simon Airport

Airports in Haiti
Les Cayes